Sara Hatami (Persian: سارا حاتمی, born June 2, 2005) is an Iranian actress. In 2023, she won the Crystal Simorgh for Best Supporting Actress at the 41st Fajr International Film Festival for her role as Soraya in Leather Jacket.

Career 
Hatami learned acting in the classes of Ashkan Khatibi and was introduced to Kiyomarth Moradi by Khatibi. Moradi was the casting director of Mortal Wound series and he accepted Hatami after she auditioned for the role of Maedeh.

Her first professional role was in the series Mortal Wound which gained her recognition, and in her second acting experience, she won a Crystal Simorgh for her role as Soraya, an addict teenager in the drama film Leather Jacket.

Filmography

Film

Web

Awards and nominations

References

External links 

 

2005 births
Actresses from Tehran
Living people
Feminist artists
Iranian feminists
Iranian translators
Iranian film actresses
Iranian stage actresses
Iranian voice actresses
Crystal Simorgh for Best Actress winners